Linda Jo Goldway Keen (born August 9, 1940, in New York City, New York) is a mathematician and a fellow of the American Mathematical Society.  Since 1965, she has been a  professor in the Department of Mathematics and Computer Science at Lehman College of The City University of New York and a Professor of Mathematics at The Graduate Center of The City University of New York.

Professional career
As a high school student  she attended the Bronx High School of Science. She received her Bachelor of Science degree from the City College of New York, then studied at the Courant Institute of Mathematical Sciences, earning her Doctor of Philosophy in mathematics in 1964. She wrote her thesis on Riemann surfaces under the direction of Lipman Bers at NYU.

Keen has worked at the Institute for Advanced Study, Hunter College, University of California at Berkeley, Columbia University, Boston University, Princeton University, and the Massachusetts Institute of Technology, as well as at various mathematical institutes in Europe and South America.  After her initial appointment in 1965, in 1974 Keen was promoted to  Full Professor at Lehman College and  the CUNY Graduate Center.  She served as Executive Officer of the Mathematics Program at the Graduate Center before retiring in 2017. 

Keen served as president of the Association for Women in Mathematics during 1985-1986 and as vice-president of the American Mathematical Society during 1992-1995. She served on the board of trustees of the  American Mathematical Society from 1999-2009 and as Associate Treasurer from 2009-2011. 
Keen worked with the mathematicians Paul Blanchard, Robert L. Devaney, Jane Gilman, Lisa Goldberg,Yunping Jiang,  Nikola Lakic and Caroline Series among many others.

In 1975, Keen presented an AMS invited address and in 1989 she presented an MAA joint invited address. In 1993 she was selected as a Noether Lecturer by the Association for Women in Mathematics.

Contributions
In addition to studying Riemann surfaces, Keen has worked in hyperbolic geometry, Kleinian groups and Fuchsian groups, complex analysis, and hyperbolic dynamics.  In the field of hyperbolic geometry, she is known for the Collar lemma.

Personal
She is married to Jonathan Brezin and resides in New York.

Awards and honors
She has been honored with:
AAUW Postdoctoral Fellowship Award, 1964–65
National Science Foundation Postdoctoral  Fellow, 1964–65
Edwin S. Webster-Abby Rockefeller Mauze Award, M.I.T. 1990
Finnish Mathematical Society Invited Foreign Speaker, JAN 1991
Association for Women in Mathematics Emmy Noether Lecturer, 1993
Joint Irish and London Mathematical Societies Invited Speaker, 1998
Lehman College Foundation Faculty Award, 1998
MAA Invited hour Address, Boulder CO, 1989
Swedish Royal Academy of Sciences Kovalevsky Days Programme Main Speaker, 2006

In 2012 she became a fellow of the American Mathematical Society.

In 2017, she was selected as a fellow of the Association for Women in Mathematics in the inaugural class.

Books
 Hyperbolic Geometry from a Local Viewpoint (with Nikola Lakic, London Mathematical Society Student Texts 68, Cambridge University Press, 2007)
 The Legacy of Sonya Kovalevskaya (edited, Contemporary Mathematics 64, American Mathematical Society, 1987)
 Chaos and Fractals: The Mathematics
Behind the Computer Graphics (edited with  Robert L. Devaney, Proc. Symposia in Appl. Math, 39,
American Mathematical Society, 1989) 
 Lipa's Legacy: Proceedings of the 1st Bers Colloquium (edited with Józef Dodziuk, Contemporary Mathematics 211, American Mathematical Society, 1997)
 Complex dynamics. Twenty-five years after the appearance of the Mandelbrot set (edited with Robert L. Devaney, Contemporary Mathematics 396, American Mathematical Society, 2006)
 Lipman Bers, a Life in Mathematics (edited with Irwin Kra and Rubí E. Rodríguez, American Mathematical Society, 2015)

References

External links
 Linda Keen
 Understanding Chaos 
 Linda Keen

American women mathematicians
20th-century American mathematicians
21st-century American mathematicians
1940 births
Living people
City College of New York alumni
Courant Institute of Mathematical Sciences alumni
Lehman College faculty
Institute for Advanced Study visiting scholars
Hunter College faculty
University of California, Berkeley faculty
Columbia University faculty
Boston University faculty
Princeton University faculty
Massachusetts Institute of Technology faculty
City University of New York faculty
Fellows of the American Mathematical Society
Fellows of the Association for Women in Mathematics
20th-century women mathematicians
21st-century women mathematicians
20th-century American women
21st-century American women